This is a list of drinking games. Drinking games involve the consumption of alcoholic beverages. Evidence of the existence of drinking games dates back to antiquity. They have been banned at some institutions, particularly colleges and universities.

0-9
 21

A
 Around the world
 Asshole

B

 Bar-hopping
 Bartok (card game)
 Baseball
 Beer bong
 Beer can pyramid
 Beer checkers
 Beer die
 Beer helmet
 Beer mile
 Beer pong
 Beer pong (paddles)
 Beerdarts
 Biscuit
 Boat race
 Boot of beer
 Buffalo

D
 Detonator
 Dizzy bat

E

F

 Fingers
 Flip cup
 Fuzzy duck

G
 Goon of Fortune

H

 Hi, Bob
 High jinks
 Horserace

I
 Ice luge
 Icing

K
 Kastenlauf
 Keg stand
 Kings
 Kinito
 Kottabos

L

 Liar's dice

M
 Matchbox

N
 Neknominate
 Never have I ever

P
 Pass-Out
 Patruni e sutta
 Power hour
 President
 Pub golf
 Pyramid
 Pyramid of fire

Q

 Quarters
 Quodlibet

R
 Ring of fire

S

 Schlafmütze
 Scum
 Sevens, elevens, and doubles
 Ship, captain, and crew
 Shotgunning
 Sinking
 Slam pong
 Snap-dragon
 Spoof

T
 Three man
 Toepen

U
 Up Jenkins

W

 Wizard staff

Y
 Yard of ale

Z
 Zoom Schwartz Profigliano

See also

 Beer bong
 Pub crawl
 Pub games games which are or were played in pubs, bars, inns, and taverns, particularly traditional games played in English pubs. Most are indoor games, though some are played outdoors.
 List of public house topics
 Marathon du Médoc
 Long-distance race involving alcohol
 World Series of Beer Pong

References

External links
 

Drinking games
Drinking games
Party games